Agonochaetia is a genus of moths in the family Gelechiidae.

Species
Agonochaetia conspersa (Braun, 1921)
Agonochaetia impunctella (Caradja, 1920)
Agonochaetia incredibilis (Povolný, 1965)
Agonochaetia intermedia (Sattler, 1968)
Agonochaetia quartana (Povolný, 1990)
Agonochaetia terrestrella (Zeller, 1872)
Agonochaetia tuvella (Bidzilya, 2000)

References

 
Gnorimoschemini
Moth genera